{{Automatic taxobox
|name = Rhus sp. nov. A
|status = VU
|status_system = IUCN3.1
|status_ref = 
|taxon = Rhus
|species_text = R. sp. nov. A|binomial_text = Rhus sp. nov. A
}}Rhus sp. nov. A is a species of flowering plant in the cashew family, Anacardiaceae, that is endemic to the Socotra Archipelago in Yemen.  It can be found on the rocky slopes of wadis in drought-deciduous woodlands and succulent shrublands.

References

Endemic flora of Socotra
Sp. nov. A
Vulnerable plants
Undescribed plant species
Taxonomy articles created by Polbot